Aïn Larbaâ District is a district of Aïn Témouchent Province, Algeria.

Municipalities
The district is further divided into 4 municipalities:
Aïn El Arbaa
Tamzoura
Sidi Boumedienne
Oued Sabah

References 

Districts of Aïn Témouchent Province